USS Newman K. Perry (DD-883/DDR-883), was a  of the United States Navy.

Namesake
Newman Kershaw Perry was born on 28 November 1880 in South Carolina. He was appointed Naval Cadet on 9 September 1897 and commissioned Ensign on 7 June 1903.

Construction and commissioning
Newman K. Perry was laid down by the Consolidated Steel Corporation at Orange, Texas on 10 October 1944, launched on 17 March 1945 by Mrs. Laura P. Gunter, sister of Ensign Perry and commissioned on 26 July 1945.

Service history

1945–1949
Following shakedown, Newman K. Perry served briefly with the Atlantic Fleet. On 7 November 1945, she got underway for Pearl Harbor, whence she traveled to Japan for three months' occupation duty. She returned to Pearl Harbor on 28 March 1946 and was assigned to Joint Task Force 1 for "Operation Crossroads", the 1946 atomic bomb test series at Bikini. Sailing for the Marshall Islands on 27 May, she witnessed tests "Able" and "Baker" and, in August, steamed for the United States.

On 18 August she arrived at San Diego whence she operated until 25 August 1947. Then, with DesDiv 132, she headed west, arriving at Yokosuka on 13 September. Three days later she sailed to Tsingtao to commence a series of patrol, escort, search and rescue, ASW, and hydrographic survey missions and exercises along the China coast and off Taiwan and Okinawa. Relieved on 5 May 1948, she returned to San Diego, trained naval reservists through the summer, and in October entered the Mare Island Naval Shipyard for overhaul.

The destroyer departed San Francisco on 15 January 1949 and until April conducted exercises off the west coast. On 4 April, she departed San Diego with DesDiv 182 for Newport, Rhode Island, her new homeport, arriving 21 April.

1950–1968
After her return to Destroyer Forces, Atlantic Fleet, she rotated tours with the 6th Fleet in the Mediterranean Sea and midshipmen and reservist training cruises, and fleet, squadron and type training exercises with the 2nd Fleet. Redesignated a radar picket destroyer in 1950, she conducted her scheduled operations as DDR–883 until 1964 when Newman K. Perry underwent the FRAM I refit at the Boston Naval Shipyard until February 1965. The most visible alteration were the new bridge, the addition of a hangar and landing deck aft for the Gyrodyne QH-50 DASH drone and the addition of an ASROC launcher between the funnels. Modernized into a "regular" destroyer again, she resumed the designation DD-883.

In October 1965 she collided with the aircraft carrier  in the Mediterranean, killing one and injuring another.  A change in operations in 1959 took her to Charleston, South Carolina, which served as her homeport for several years before she resumed operations out of Newport.

A second change in operations took her to the Western Pacific for her overseas deployment in 1966. Departing Newport with Destroyer Division 201 on 4 October, she transited the Panama Canal, stopped in Hawaii, Japan, Okinawa and the Philippines, and arrived on station in the Mekong Delta of South Vietnam on 23 November. Assigned to fire support duties, she shelled enemy coastal storage areas until the 28th. She then shifted to Phú Quốc island, off the Cambodian-South Vietnamese border, to support Vietnamese and Special Forces units for five days, returning to the Delta area in December. Other assignments on that tour with the 7th Fleet took her along the coast to the DMZ and then to the Gulf of Tonkin for plane guard and search and rescue missions. On 8 March 1967, she departed the combat zone for Hong Kong before returning to Subic Bay for the last time. On the 27th she departed the Philippines for the Mediterranean and Newport, arriving on 8 May.

After overhaul at Boston, Newman K. Perry began 1968, with Caribbean exercises and on 4 April departed Newport for the Mediterranean to resume her annual deployments with the 6th Fleet.

1969–1981

In the 1971 Newman K. Perry was assigned to the Naval Reserve Force (NRF) as a unit of Destroyer Squadron 28.  She was based in Newport, Rhode Island with a composite crew of active and reserve sailors.  In Oct 1974, she hit a buoy foundation in NY harbor, opening a hole in the scoop injection of the forward engine room. After emergency repairs, she spent the night tied to a pier in Hoboken, NJ.  Choppy seas from a storm that night broke open a steam pipe in the forward boiler room, as the ship was slammed into the pier for most of the night.  A month in drydock at Todd Shipyards in Brooklyn followed.  Then she left for Norfolk to test guns, where a forward turret misfired, causing further damage.  She was decommissioned and stricken from the Naval Vessel Register on 27 February 1981.

ROKS Kyong Ki
Newman K. Perry was  transferred to South Korea in 1981 for service in the Republic of Korea Navy and renamed ROKS Kyong Ki. South Korea decommissioned Kyong Ki in 1997. She later was damaged by fire and scrapped in 1999.

References

External links

 

 

Gearing-class destroyers of the United States Navy
Ships built in Orange, Texas
1945 ships
World War II destroyers of the United States
Cold War destroyers of the United States
Vietnam War destroyers of the United States
Ships transferred from the United States Navy to the Republic of Korea Navy